Oscillatoria princeps is the type species (lectotype) of the cyanobacterial (blue green algal) genus Oscillatoria.

The cyanobacterium is dark blue green in colour, due to the presence of the phycobilin pigments phycocyanin and phycoerythrin. Individual filaments are blue green to olive green in colour. Growth takes place only by transverse division hence the trichome comprises a single row of cells stacked one above the other. A cytoplasmic sheath is present which is very thin, hyaline and indistinct.

Mature trichomes are straight, the cells much broader than long and has hemispherical apical cell with keritomized (irregular to radial thylakoid arrangement) content. Trichome unconstricted in growth phase and constrictions were observed during reproduction. Distinct cross walls present. The size of the cells varies from 57.6 µm to 69.1 µm in width and 5.2 µm to 9.6 µm in length thus the ratio of the length and breadth is 1:8.

Stack of poker chips 
The cells of the trichomes were round in shape and when such cells were stacked one above the other it gives "stack of poker chips" appearance characteristic feature of this species.

Crack-like nick on filament 
A crack-like nick was observed on the trichomes was found by V. Uma Rani et al. in microscopic view. While they studying individual cells notches were found at the inner side of the cell corresponding the slit on the trichome. When such cells were stacked one above the other, it results in the crack like structure on the trichome. Thus, the number of notches in a single cell equals the number of slits on the trichome. One to three notches / slits were observed in the study by Uma Rani et al. 2015.

Reproduction 
Reproduction takes place only by vegetative methods namely fragmentation and hormogonia. Both the methods were observed in the most of the study. Fragmentation takes place by the degradation of weakened cells or mechanically damaged cells. The trichome divides into smaller fragments. The cells of the fragment by repeated division develop into a new filament.

Distribution 
This species is ubiquitous in distribution. it reported from both marine and freshwater.

References

Species described in 1822
Oscillatoriales